The Malek bin Abbas Mosque dates from the Timurid Empire and is located in Hormozgan Province, Bandar Lengeh.

Sources 

Mosques in Iran
Mosque buildings with domes
National works of Iran
Bandar Lengeh County
Buildings and structures in Hormozgan Province
Hormozgan Province articles missing geocoordinate data